A cricothyrotomy (also called cricothyroidotomy) is an incision made through the skin and cricothyroid membrane to establish a patent airway during certain life-threatening situations, such as airway obstruction by a foreign body, angioedema, or massive facial trauma. Cricothyrotomy is nearly always performed as a last resort in cases where other means of tracheal intubation are impossible or impractical. Compared with tracheotomy, cricothyrotomy is quicker and easier to perform, does not require manipulation of the cervical spine, and is associated with fewer complications. However, while cricothyrotomy may be life-saving in extreme circumstances, this technique is only intended to be a temporizing measure until a definitive airway can be established.

Indications
A cricothyrotomy is often used as an airway of last resort given the numerous other airway options available including standard tracheal intubation and rapid sequence induction which are the common means of establishing an airway in an emergency scenario. Cricothyrotomies account for approximately 1% of all emergency department intubations, and is used mostly in persons who have experienced a traumatic injury.

Some general indications for this procedure include:
Inability to intubate
Inability to ventilate
Inability to maintain SpO2 >90%
Severe traumatic injury that prevents oral or nasal tracheal intubation

Contraindications
Inability to identify landmarks (cricothyroid membrane)
Underlying anatomical abnormality such as a tumor or severe goiter
Tracheal transection
Acute laryngeal disease due to infection or trauma
Small children under 12 years old (a 10–14 gauge catheter over the needle may be used)

Procedure
The procedure was first described in 1805 by Félix Vicq-d'Azyr, a French surgeon and anatomist. A cricothyrotomy is generally performed by making a vertical incision on the skin of the throat just below the laryngeal prominence (Adam's apple), then making a horizontal incision in the cricothyroid membrane which lies deep to this point. A tracheostomy tube or endotracheal tube with a 6 or 7 mm internal diameter is then inserted, the cuff is inflated, and the tube is secured. The person performing the procedure might utilize a bougie device, a semi-rigid, straight piece of plastic with a one-inch tip at a 30-degree angle, to provide rigidity to the tube and assist with guiding its placement. Confirmation of placement is assessed by bilateral ausculation of the lungs and observation of the rise and fall of the chest. Alternatively, bedside ultrasound has been used increasingly to guide the procedure and confirm the placement of the tracheal tube. It may especially be helpful in situations where a neck collar is placed.

Training
This procedure is rarely performed, given advancements in airway technique and adjuncts, and thus simulated training is of paramount importance to correctly perform this procedure under a high-stress situation.

Needle cricothyrotomy
A needle cricothyrotomy is similar, but instead of making a scalpel incision, a large over-the-needle catheter is inserted (10- to 14-gauge). This is considerably simpler, particularly if using specially designed kits. This technique provides very limited airflow. The delivery of oxygen to the lungs through an over-the-needle catheter inserted through the skin into the trachea using a high pressure gas source is considered a form of conventional ventilation called percutaneous transtracheal ventilation (PTV).

In popular media
On the TV show M*A*S*H, Father Mulcahy performs an emergency cricothyrotomy on a patient. With the direction of Dr. Pierce via radio, he uses a pen, knife and an eyedropper to perform the operation. Needless to say, this would be extremely dangerous in real life. Even under ideal, clinical conditions, a cricothyrotomy is difficult and requires specific tools, preparation and a practiced knowledge of anatomy. There are many major blood vessels and nerves in the neck and cutting there carries a high risk of harming the patient.

In the 1980 Nicolas Roeg film Bad Timing, Theresa Russell's character Milena Flaherty has an emergency cricothyrotomy performed following an intentional overdose.

In Grey's Anatomy, emergency cricothyrotomy is mentioned in at least three episodes:
In "Owner of a Lonely Heart," Cristina almost performs an emergency cricothyrotomy on a patient who swallowed a light bulb. Before she is able to do so, however, Dr. Burke shows up and takes the patient to an operating room where he proceeds to perform an emergency thoracotomy.
In "The Heart of the Matter," Izzie performs her first emergency crike on Camille, a niece of Chief of Surgery Dr. Richard Webber.
 In "I Saw What I Saw" Alex performs a crike on the patient who later dies.

In the ER episode "Reason to Believe" Dr. Kerry Weaver performs an emergency cricothyrotomy on a student. She is shooting a news segment on childhood obesity in an elementary school cafeteria when one of the students begins to choke; after the heimlich maneuver fails, she performs a cricothyrotomy with a kitchen knife and a drinking straw. It is also used many other times, especially in the trauma room, when an airway cannot be established.

In the film Playing God (1997), David Duchovny plays a famed LA surgeon, stripped of his license due to drug abuse, who finds himself witnessing a gunfight at a bar. He saves a mafia crime figure by performing an emergency cricothyrotomy.  This endears him with the mafia family and drives the plot forward. 

In the BBC3 medical drama Bodies, the main protagonist Rob Lake, a newly appointed obstetrics and gynaecology registrar (played by Max Beesley), is called to a patient who is having difficulty breathing due to epiglottitis. Lake calls for emergency assistance but help is slow coming, so fearing for the patient's life decides to undertake a cricothyrotomy himself - a procedure he has not been trained in. The procedure is unsuccessful and the patient dies before help arrives. The guilt surrounding the event combined with the covering up by his consultant provides an important backdrop to the further development of the character and his relationship with his consultant.

In Dr. Quinn, Medicine Woman, Sully, the white man raised by Native Americans who is her lover and companion, performs the procedure on one of Dr. Quinn's boys using a bird's feather (the base where it is hollow).

During an episode of the National Geographic Channel documentary "Inside Combat Rescue", a US Air Force Pararescueman in Afghanistan performs an actual cricothyrotomy on a wounded civilian, in a helicopter maneuvering under combat conditions. The procedure is successful and the patient is delivered to Kandahar Regional Medical Hospital.

On the New Zealand soap opera Shortland Street, Series 21, Episode 5104/5105, student doctor Paige Munroe performs a cricothyrotomy with a pocket knife and pen and saves a woman's life, even though she was not qualified (and nervous).

In the novel Night Train to Lisbon by Swiss author Pascal Mercier, one of the protagonists saves the life of his asphyxiating sister by performing a provisional cricothyrotomy with a ballpoint pen.

In the 1997 film Anaconda, when the character Dr. Steven Cale (Eric Stoltz) is stung in the mouth by a venomous wasp found in his scuba equipment, Paul Serone (Jon Voight) performs the procedure using a pocket knife and rigid plastic tube.

In the manga Golden Wind, the fifth story arc of JoJo's Bizarre Adventure, the character Narancia Ghirga has his tongue cut off, requiring the use of only a pen in an emergency cricothyrotomy.

See also
Laryngotomy
Tracheotomy
 List of surgeries by type

Footnotes

References

 Barone, Jeanine. Tracheotomy. health.enotes.com. URL last accessed February 28, 2006.
 Brookside Associates; US Army Medical department. Cricothyroidotomy. www.brooksidepress.org. URL last accessed February 28, 2006.
 Dorland's Illustrated Medical Dictionary. URL last accessed February 28, 2006.
 Reis, Carlos. Cricothyroidotomy. www.medstudents.com.br. URL last accessed February 28, 2006.
 SIAARTI study committee on the difficult airway. SIAARTI guidelines for difficult intubation and for difficult airway management. anestit.unipa.it. URL last accessed February 28, 2006.
Mosby's Paramedic Textbook, Edition 3, Mick J. Sanders. 2005, St. Louis, MO: Elsevier Mosby.

External links
 Smiths Medical Cricothyroidotomy Kits (Cricothyroidotomy products for Adults and Children)
 Medstudents: Procedures: Cricothyrotomy
 Trauma Man: Image of Cricothyroidotomy being performed on a simulator

Airway management
Emergency medical procedures
Trachea surgery